Tina is a genus of moths belonging to the family Tortricidae.

Species
Tina audaculana ( Busck, 1907)

See also
List of Tortricidae genera

References

External links
tortricidae.com

Atteriini
Tortricidae genera